Calonarius flavipallens is a species of agaric fungus in the family Cortinariaceae.

Taxonomy 
It was originally described in 2014 by the mycologists Ilkka Kytövuori, Kare Liimatainen and Tuula Niskanen who classified it as Cortinarius flavipallens. It was placed in the (subgenus Phlegmacium) of the large mushroom genus Cortinarius.

In 2022 the species was transferred from Cortinarius and reclassified as Calonarius flavipallens based on genomic data.

Etymology 
The specific epithet flavipallens refers to its pale ochre cap colours.

Habitat and distribution 
Found in Picea abies-dominated boreal forest in Finland, it was described as new to science in 2014.

Similar species 
Other Cortinarius species with a roughly similar appearance include C. metarius, C. caesiocinctus, and C. piceae.

See also
List of Cortinarius species

References

External links

flavipallens
Fungi described in 2014
Fungi of Finland